Bob Crouch is chief executive officer at Adecco Group North America, a  professional recruiting, staffing, consulting and business services provider headquartered in Jacksonville, Florida.

In 2010, the company purchased staffing company Modis.

References

Year of birth missing (living people)
Living people